The Homestead is a historic apartment hotel at 1625 Hinman Avenue in Evanston, Illinois. Opened in 1928, it was one of several apartment hotels built in Evanston in the 1920s. Popular in the early twentieth century, apartment hotels housed a mixture of short-term and long-term guests; they were frequently used by workers who did not wish or could not afford to live near their workplace full-time. Architect Philip Arthur Danielson designed the building in the Colonial Revival style, which was used on many other apartments from the era in Evanston. The design includes a verandah supported by Doric columns along the front facade, two projecting three-bay windows, brick quoins, and a dentillated cornice with a pediment.

The building was added to the National Register of Historic Places on February 1, 2006.

References

External links

Buildings and structures on the National Register of Historic Places in Cook County, Illinois
Residential buildings on the National Register of Historic Places in Illinois
Residential buildings completed in 1928
Colonial Revival architecture in Illinois
Buildings and structures in Evanston, Illinois